Clubul Sportiv Municipal Târgoviște, commonly known as CSM Târgoviște, is a professional volleyball club based in Târgoviște, Romania, that competes in the CEV Cup.

Honours

Domestic 
 Cupa României 
 Winners (1): 2016

 Supercupa României 
 Winners (1): 2016

Team

Current squad
Squad for the 2020-21 season    
  Diana Calotă 
  Alexandra Trică
  Rodica Buterez 
  Mihaela Pamfil 
  Teodora Pušić
  Heidy Casanova
  Ilka Van de Vyver
  Dominika Sobolska
  Iryna Trushkina
  Gergana Dimitrova
  Maria Yordanova
  Leah Meyer

See also
 Romania women's national volleyball team

References

External links
Official website 
CEV profile
Voleiromania profile

Volleyball
Romanian volleyball clubs
Sport in Târgoviște
1991 establishments in Romania
Volleyball clubs established in 1991